The South Side Presbyterian Church is a historic church in the South Side Flats neighborhood of Pittsburgh, Pennsylvania, and a designated Pittsburgh historic landmark.

It was built in 1869–70 by the First Presbyterian Church of Birmingham, a congregation established in 1851 in what was then the independent borough of Birmingham. In 1873 the name was changed to South Side Presbyterian Church after Birmingham was annexed into the city of Pittsburgh. The original church was built by John T. Natcher and cost $30,000. In 1893, the building was expanded with a new front section including asymmetrical towers and a new main entrance. The rear of the property also includes a community center and gymnasium which were added in 1913.

The church is a two-story, brick, Gothic Revival-style building. The original section is six bays deep with Gothic arched windows on the second floor and smaller rectangular windows on the first floor. The 1893 addition added one additional bay to the front of the building which includes a narthex area with a  bell tower on the east side and a shorter  tower on the west side.

References

City of Pittsburgh historic designations
Churches in Pittsburgh
Presbyterian churches in Pennsylvania
Churches completed in 1870